101 Ways to Leave a Game Show is an American game show hosted by Jeff Sutphen. The series premiered on June 21, 2011, on ABC and ran for six episodes.

On June 9, 2010, ABC gave a greenlight for a pilot episode. On March 17, 2011, it was ordered to series by ABC. Matt Kunitz, the show's executive producer had stated "If we get a pickup, we'll do at least 12 more episodes."

Rules

Main Game
The game featured eight players, but in this version, they were divided into two sets of four.  Before the question is asked, the order of the contestants is determined with an educated guess question (such as "How many teeth does a lion have?") The one closest to the answer (in this case, 30) gets the first choice of answers from four picks (three in the second round), and the others in ascending order. If a player got an educated guess question exactly right, that contestant won a US $101 bonus.

The question (in this case, name a person on Forbes highest earning dead celebrity list with the choices being Paul Newman, Dr. Seuss, Albert Einstein and George Steinbrenner) is asked.  For all answers, there is one incorrect answer; all remaining answers (three in round one, two in round two) are correct. The player who picks last is locked into the one answer not chosen by the other players; the person who picks the wrong answer (in this case, Paul Newman) is eliminated in spectacular fashion (riding a biplane wing, pulled off a dock by a speedboat or blasted off in a chair rigged with an explosive device).

The Tower
As in the preliminary rounds, an educated guess question is asked, and the closest to the number is first. Unlike the early rounds, only one answer is correct, and the others are wrong (An example being "According to Box Office Mojo, what movie sold the most tickets in the USA?" chosen among Star Wars, Titanic, Avatar and Gone with the Wind.) The three incorrect answer choosers are dropped into the water, and the person who remains (choosing Gone with the Wind) won the US $50,000 grand prize and if the winning player got the educated question right then their total is $50,101 . Each episode features a different way in which the contestants fall into the water (apart from the first episode and the last episode where the way of falling is the same).

Episodes

The 101  Ways to Leave a Game Show
Please note that although the title suggests there are 101 Ways used, only 25 were shown on the actual program.

References

External links
 Official Website (via Internet Archive)
 

2010s American reality television series
2011 American television series debuts
2011 American television series endings
American Broadcasting Company original programming
2010s American game shows
English-language television shows
Television series by Banijay
American television series based on British television series